"A Teenager's Romance" is a song written by Theodore Gillum and performed by Ricky Nelson. The song reached #2 on the Billboard Top 100 in 1957.

The song was ranked #25 on Billboard magazine's Top Hot 100 songs of 1957.

The song's A-side, "I'm Walkin'", reached #4 on the Billboard chart and #10 on the R&B chart.

References

1957 songs
1957 singles
Ricky Nelson songs
Verve Records singles
Songs about teenagers